Michael Sokolowski (born 24 February 1962) is a retired Canadian sprinter. He was a member of Canada's 4 × 400 metres relay at the 1984 Summer Olympics, which placed 8th. Alongside nearly every sprinter at the Scarborough Optimist Track and Field Club, Mike admitted to using performance-enhancing drugs at the Dubin Inquiry in 1989 and subsequently had his funding suspended.

He is the older brother of fellow Olympian John Sokolowski.

References

1962 births
Living people
Canadian male sprinters
Canadian sportspeople in doping cases
Doping cases in athletics
Ben Johnson doping case
Athletes (track and field) at the 1984 Summer Olympics
Olympic track and field athletes of Canada
Polish emigrants to Canada
Sportspeople from Katowice